The 1820 United States presidential election in Pennsylvania took place as part of the 1820 United States presidential election. Voters chose 25 representatives, or electors to the Electoral College, who voted for President and Vice President. Only 24 electoral votes were cast from Pennsylvania, however, one of the electors having died.

During this election, James Monroe was re-elected by a large margin. Pennsylvania voted for Monroe over opposition candidate DeWitt Clinton.

Results

Note: Election results totals only include known numbers, as verified by the source. Vote totals from several counties are missing/unknown.

See also
 List of United States presidential elections in Pennsylvania

References

Pennsylvania
1820
1820 Pennsylvania elections